Høle is a previous borough and a village in the  eastern part of Sandnes municipality in Rogaland county, Norway, located along the Høgsfjorden. The area was historically a part of the municipality of Høle.  Høle Church and Høle School are both located in the village. 

The borough of Høle is the least populous (and most rural) borough in the city of Sandnes with 1,042 inhabitants. The  borough is located in the eastern part of the municipality.

References

 

Boroughs and neighbourhoods of Sandnes
Villages in Rogaland